Richard Blackstock (13 July 1838 – 3 February 1893) was an English cricketer active in first-class cricket, making four appearances in the 1850s and 1860s. Born at Oxton, Birkenhead, Cheshire, Blackstock was a right-handed batsman who played as a wicket-keeper.

Career
A club cricketer for Birkenhead Park Cricket Club, keeping wicket for the club when William Lockhart was unavailable. Blackstock made his first-class debut in 1858 at The Oval when he played for the Gentlemen of the North against the Gentlemen of the South. His next appearance in first-class cricket came five years later in 1863, when he played two matches for the North in the North v South fixture. Two years later he made a single first-class appearance for Lancashire in its inaugural first-class match against Middlesex, with Blackstock opening the batting and therefore having the distinction of being the first Lancashire batsman to face a delivery in first-class cricket. Across his four first-class appearances, Blackstock scored a total of 154 runs at an average of 22.00, with a high score of 47.

Outside of cricket he was a builders merchant. He died at Oxton on 3 February 1893.

Notes and references

External links
Richard Blackstock at ESPNcricinfo
Richard Blackstock at CricketArchive

1838 births
1893 deaths
Sportspeople from Birkenhead
English cricketers
Gentlemen of the North cricketers
North v South cricketers
Lancashire cricketers